Itabi is a municipality located in the Brazilian state of Sergipe. In 2020, its population was 4,886.

References

Municipalities in Sergipe